Fanndís Friðriksdóttir (born 9 May 1990) is an Icelandic women's footballer who plays as a left winger for Valur in the Icelandic Úrvalsdeild kvenna, and currently for Australian club Adelaide United for the 2018–19 W-League season. She spent the 2017–2018 season with Olympique de Marseille in the French Division 1 Féminine and has previously played in the Úrvalsdeild kvenna for Breiðablik and the Norwegian Toppserien for Kolbotn and Arna-Bjørnar. Fanndís has been a part of the Iceland's national team since 2009 and represented her country at the 2009, 2013 and 2017 editions of the UEFA Women's Championship.

Club career
Born in Akureyri, Fanndís grew up in Vestmannaeyjar where she start playing in the youth teams of ÍBV before moving to Kópavogur in 2004, to play professionally for Breiðablik.

After eight seasons at the Icelandic Úrvalsdeild kvenna with Breiðablik, where she scored 50 goals in 107 league matches, Fanndís decided to join Norwegian Toppserien club Kolbotn, signing a year contract on 6 December 2012. Ahead of her second season in Norway, she moved from Kolbotn to Arna-Bjørnar in December 2013.

On 15 May 2014, Fanndís was released from her contract by Arna-Bjørnar after requesting a move back to Iceland to play for Breiðablik. As the request happened during Icelandic's last players transfer registration day, it was only confirmed on the following day (16 May 2014), that Fanndís was successfully registered as a Breiðablik player, her second spell at the club.

At the end of the 2017 season, after four seasons of her second spell at Breiðablik, she had a combined total (both spells) of 104 goals scored in 197 matches in all Icelandic domestic competitions, of which 97 goals were scored in 173 league matches.

In August 2017, she became the first Icelandic female player to join a French Division 1 Féminine club by signing a year contract to play for Olympique de Marseille.

On 27 June 2018, Fanndís signed with Úrvalsdeild kvenna club Valur. In September 2018, she was loaned to Adelaide United of the Australian W-League. She scored 2 goals in 11 matches for the club, witch finished 6th in the league, 1 point out of the playoffs.

International career
Fanndís has represented Iceland since 2005, initially at the under 17 team, progressing to the under 19 and eventually arriving at the senior team in 2009, making her senior international debut on 9 March 2009 in a 2–0 defeat by Denmark at the 2009 Algarve Cup.

A few months later she was called up to be part of Iceland squad at the UEFA Women's Euro 2009, where she made two brief substitute appearances as Iceland were eliminated in the first round.

She played matches at the 2011 FIFA Women's World Cup qualification, 2010 Algarve Cup, 2011 Algarve Cup and UEFA Women's Euro 2013 qualification before scoring her first goal for Iceland on 5 March 2012 in a 1–0 win over China at the 2012 Algarve Cup. Her second goal came on 15 September 2012 at a UEFA Women's Euro 2013 qualification 2–0 win over Northern Ireland.

After playing the 2013 Algarve Cup and friendly matches, national team coach Siggi Eyjólfsson selected Fanndís in the Iceland squad for the UEFA Women's Euro 2013. She started three out of the four matches Iceland played in the tournament, including the Quarterfinal 4–0 defeat by Sweden.

Fanndís scored her third goal on 10 March 2014 in a 1–0 win over China at the 2014 Algarve Cup. Her fourth and fifth goals came during the 2015 FIFA Women's World Cup qualification, the fourth on 10 April 2014 in an 8–0 win over Malta and the fifth on 13 September 2014 in a 3–0 win over Israel.

After playing the 2015 Algarve Cup and 2016 Algarve Cup, Fanndís scored again during the UEFA Women's Euro 2017 qualification matches, with her first brace (two goals in one match) for Iceland on 7 June 2016 in an 8–0 win over Macedonia and one more goal came on 20 September 2016 in a 2–1 defeat by Scotland, taking her tally to eight goals. Her ninth and tenth were scored at the 2016 Sincere Cup, on 20 October 2016 in a 2–2 draw with China and on 24 October 2016 in a 1–0 win over Uzbekistan.

She took part at the 2017 Algarve Cup and played in some friendly matches before national coach Freyr Alexandersson selected her to the national team for the UEFA Women's Euro 2017. Fanndís started all three matches Iceland played in the tournament, scoring the country's only goal in the tournament and her 11th goal for Iceland, on 22 July 2017 in a 2–1 defeat by Switzerland.

Fanndís scored her second brace for the national team during Iceland opening match of the 2019 FIFA Women's World Cup qualification on 18 September 2017 in an 8–0 win over Faroe Islands, it took her tally to 13 goals.

Personal life
Fanndís's father is former Iceland men's national football team goalkeeper Friðrik Friðriksson and her mother is former Olympic alpine skier Nanna Leifsdóttir.

Honours
Úrvalsdeild kvenna: Winner 2005, 2015, 2019
Icelandic Women's Cup: Winner 2005, 2016
Most Promising Player in Breiðablik in 2008
Úrvalsdeild kvenna Player of the year in 2015

References

External links
 
 
 Player French domestic stats (in French) at Footofeminin.fr

1990 births
Living people
People from Akureyri
People from Vestmannaeyjar
Fanndis Fridriksdottir
Fanndis Fridriksdottir
Expatriate women's footballers in Norway
Icelandic expatriate sportspeople in Norway
Icelandic expatriates in France
Expatriate women's footballers in France
Fanndis Fridriksdottir
Toppserien players
Division 1 Féminine players
Breiðablik UBK players
Kolbotn Fotball players
Arna-Bjørnar players
Olympique de Marseille (women) players
Women's association football wingers
Women's association football forwards
Valur (women's football) players
ÍBV women's football players
FIFA Century Club
UEFA Women's Euro 2017 players